The 1939 All-Ireland Senior Camogie Championship was the high point of the 1939 season in Camogie. The championship was won by Cork, who defeated Galway by a 15-point margin in the final.

Semi-final
The exclusion of All Ireland champions Dublin in a dispute over the ban on hockey players (in practice the All Ireland championship was organised by the National Camógaíocht Association while Dublin remained in the old Association with support from Kildare and clubs in Meath and Wicklow) was to lead to an eight-year-long split in the Camogie Association. It opened the way for Louth to win the Leinster championship once more, defeating Meath by 8–2 to 4–1 in the Leinster final in Darver. A goal entering the third quarter from Kitty Buckley and two from Renee Fitzgerald were the turning points in Cork's 6–3 to 2–3 victory over Louth in the semi-final. Louth refused Cork's offer of a walkover in the All Ireland semi-final, also fixed for Darver. They paid Cork's travelling expenses, organised a welcome reception and then made their exit from the championship by an 11-point margin. Patsy McCullagh scored all of Galway's 2–1 in the semi-final in Belfast but missed the final.

Final
Renee Fitzgerald scored four goals in the final as Cork won by 15 points. Cork were not presented with the O'Duffy Cup as Dublin had not returned it. They played in grey, green and white, the colours of county champions, Old Aloysians, who supplied ten of the starting twelve.

Final stages

 
Match Rules
50 minutes
Replay if scores level
Maximum of 3 substitutions

See also
 All-Ireland Senior Hurling Championship
 Wikipedia List of Camogie players
 National Camogie League
 Camogie All Stars Awards
 Ashbourne Cup

References

External links
 Camogie Association
 Historical reports of All Ireland finals* All-Ireland Senior Camogie Championship: Roll of Honour
 Camogie on facebook
 Camogie on GAA Oral History Project

1939 in camogie
1939